Kizito Keziron is a Ugandan footballer who plays for ZESCO United in the Zambia Super League and Uganda national team (the "Cranes") as a midfielder. In 2015, Keziron was among the nominees for male player of the year for the FUFA Airtel Player's Award.

Youth career
At his early age, he was a member of St. Mary's Kitende where he was among the Copa Coca-Cola cup winning team of 2013 in Kabale. He then joined KJT Rweshama where he played for one season in 2013/14.

Career

Vipers SC (2016-17)
He made his debut for Vipers SC in September 2014 against Entebbe FC and in the same match he scored his first goal. Kizito made 14 assists as he guided Vipers to league glory playing for the first time in the top flight League (2014/2015 season). Kizito was a pivotal player in the midfield of Vipers SC as they notched up their second league title in the club's history. Plying his maiden season in the top flight, Kizito’s passing in the middle of the park caught many of his opponents unawares.

AFC Leopards (2017-18)
In June 2017, Kizito joined Kenyan side AFC Leopards as a free agent from Vipers SC and signed a 2 year contract with them. He made his debut on 27 July 2017 against Bidco United. Keziron came off the bench to score his first goal as AFC Leopards edged Bidco United 2-1 in the GOtv Cup round of 16 at the Thika Municipal Stadium.

Kerala Blasters FC
He made his debut for Blasters on 4 January 2018 against FC Pune City coming as a substitute replacing Dimitar Berbatov in the 46th minute. He could not play the entire season as he picked an injury midway through the 2017-18 season. He continued his stint with the Blasters in 2018-19 season also.

KCCA FC
In September 2019 he joined KCCA FC and signed a 2-year contract. On 2nd October 2019, he made his debut for KCCA FC against Tooro FC.

International career
Kizito made his debut for Uganda National Team on 9 November 2014 at Mandela National Stadium against Ethiopia. He scored his first goal for Uganda National Team on 4 July 2015 against Tanzania in CHAN 2016 Preliminary Round.
He was part of the Uganda Cranes team that won CECAFA Cup 2015 in Ethiopia. He was also a squad member for Uganda which played in CHAN 2016 which took place in Rwanda.

Statistics accurate as of match played 4 June 2016

International goals

Scores and results list Uganda's goal tally first.

Career statistics

Honours

Club
Vipers SC
Ugandan Premier League: 2015
Ugandan Cup: 2016

International
Uganda
CECAFA Cup: 2015

References

External links 
 

Living people
Association football midfielders
Ugandan footballers
Uganda international footballers
1997 births
Indian Super League players
Kerala Blasters FC players
Ugandan expatriate footballers
Expatriate footballers in India
Expatriate footballers in Kenya
Ugandan expatriate sportspeople in India
Ugandan expatriate sportspeople in Kenya
Vipers SC players
A.F.C. Leopards players
Uganda A' international footballers
2016 African Nations Championship players